George Homer Ryan (born February 24, 1934) is an American former politician who served as the 39th governor of Illinois from 1999 to 2003. He served as Secretary of State of Illinois from 1991 to 1999 and as lieutenant governor under governor James Thompson from 1983 to 1991. He is a member of the Republican Party.

Elected in 1998, Ryan received national attention for his 1999 moratorium on executions in Illinois and for commuting more than 160 death sentences to life sentences in 2003. He chose not to run for reelection in 2002 in the wake of a scandal. He was later convicted of federal corruption charges and spent more than five years in federal prison and seven months of home confinement. He was released from federal prison on July 3, 2013.

Early life
George Homer Ryan was born in Maquoketa, Iowa to Jeannette (née Bowman) and Thomas Ryan, a pharmacist. Ryan grew up in Kankakee County, Illinois. After serving in the U.S. Army in Korea, he worked for his father's two drugstores. He attended Ferris State College of Pharmacy (now Ferris State University) in Big Rapids, Michigan. Eventually, he built his father's pair of pharmacies into a successful family-run chain (profiting from lucrative government-contract business selling prescription drugs to nursing homes) which he sold in 1990.
Ryan was drafted into the U.S. Army in 1954. He served a 13-month tour in Korea, working in a base pharmacy.

On June 10, 1956, Ryan married his high school sweetheart, Lura Lynn Lowe (July 5, 1934 – June 27, 2011), whom he had met in a high school English class. She grew up in Aroma Park, where her family (originally from Germany) had lived since 1834. Her father owned one of the first hybrid seed companies in the United States. The couple had five daughters (including a set of triplets); Julie, Joanne, Jeanette, Lynda and Nancy; and one son, George Homer Ryan, Jr.

Lura Lowe died of lung cancer at Riverside Hospital in Kankakee on June 27, 2011.  Ryan's brother, Tom, was a prominent political figure in Kankakee County. In addition, Ryan's sister Kathleen Dean's former son-in-law, Bruce Clark, is the Kankakee County, Illinois Clerk.

Political career
Ryan began his political career by serving on the Kankakee County Board from 1968 to 1973 (his brother Tom J. Ryan was Mayor of Kankakee for 20 years from 1965 to 1985). He was then elected to the Illinois House of Representatives, where he served from 1973 to 1983, including two terms as Minority Leader and one term as Speaker. He then spent 20 years in statewide office, as Lieutenant Governor under Governor James R. Thompson (1983–91), Secretary of State from 1991 to 1999, and as governor from 1999 to 2003. During his first term as Secretary of State, then–State Treasurer Pat Quinn was publicly critical of Ryan. Specifically, he drew attention to special vanity license plates that Ryan's office provided for clout-heavy motorists. This rivalry led Quinn in a failed bid to challenge Ryan in the 1994 general election for Secretary of State.

Term as governor

Ryan was elected Governor in 1998, defeating his opponent, Glenn Poshard, by a 51–47% margin. Ryan's running mate was first-term state representative Corinne Wood. Ryan outspent Poshard by a 4-to-1 margin. Poshard, a firm believer in campaign finance reform, placed limits on individual donations and refused to accept donations from corporate or special interests.

One of Ryan's pet projects as governor was an extensive repair of the Illinois Highway System called "Illinois FIRST". FIRST was an acronym for "Fund for Infrastructure, Roads, Schools, and Transit". Signed into law in May 1999, the law created a $6.3 billion package for use in school and transportation projects. With various matching funds programs, Illinois FIRST provided $2.2 billion for schools, $4.1 billion for public transportation, another $4.1 billion for roads, and $1.6 billion for other projects. He also improved Illinois's technology infrastructure, creating one of the first cabinet-level Offices of Technology in the country and bringing up Illinois's technology ranking in a national magazine from 48th out of the 50 states when he took office to 1st just two years later. Ryan committed record funding to education, including 51% of all new state revenues during his time in office, in addition to the billions spent through Illinois FIRST that built and improved schools and education infrastructure. In 1999, Ryan sparked controversy by becoming the first sitting U.S. Governor to meet with Cuban President Fidel Castro. Ryan's visit led to a $1 million donation of humanitarian aid, but drew criticism from anti-Castro groups. In 2000, Ryan served as a chair of the Midwestern Governors Association.

Capital punishment
Ryan helped to renew the national debate on capital punishment when, as governor, he declared a moratorium on his state's death penalty in 2000.

This decision was heavily influenced by lawsuits filed by exonerated prisoners who made false confessions as a result of police torture under the direction of a police commander named Jon Burge. "We have now freed more people than we have put to death under our system," he said. "There is a flaw in the system, without question, and it needs to be studied." At the time, Illinois had executed 12 people since the reinstatement of the death penalty in 1977, with one execution, that of Ripper Crew member Andrew Kokoraleis, occurring early during Ryan's term. Ryan refused to meet with religious leaders and others regarding "a stay of execution" in light of the impending 'moratorium' and other facts relative to the 'flawed' capital punishment system in Illinois; in fact, under Ryan's governorship, 13 people were released from jail after appealing their convictions based on new evidence. Ryan called for a commission to study the issue, while noting, "I still believe the death penalty is a proper response to heinous crimes ... But I believe that it has to be where we don't put innocent people to death."

The issue had garnered the attention of the public when a death row inmate, Anthony Porter, who had spent 15 years on death row, was within two days of being executed when his lawyers won a stay on the grounds that he may have been mentally disabled. He was ultimately exonerated with the help of a group of student journalists at Northwestern University who had uncovered evidence that was used to prove his innocence. In 1999, Porter was released, charges were subsequently dropped, and another person, Alstory Simon, confessed and pleaded guilty to the crime of which Porter had been erroneously convicted. Simon himself was later released after serving fifteen years for the crime, after it was proven that he, too, was wrongfully accused.

On January 11, 2003, just two days before leaving office, Ryan commuted (to "life" terms) the sentences of everyone on or waiting to be sent to Illinois' death row — a total of 167 convicts — due to his belief that the death penalty could not be administered fairly. He also pardoned four inmates, Aaron Patterson, Madison Hobley and Leroy Orange (all of whom were interrogated by Burge and released), and Stanley Howard. However, Patterson is currently serving 30 years in prison after being arrested for drug trafficking he committed after his release from death row. Howard remains in prison for armed robbery. Ryan declared in his pardon speech that he would have freed Howard if only his attorney had filed a clemency petition; Ryan then strongly urged investigators to examine Howard's alleged robbery case, because it appeared to be as tainted as his murder conviction.

These were four of ten death row inmates known as the "Death Row 10," due to widely reported claims that the confessions that they had given in their respective cases had been coerced through torture. Ryan is not the first state governor to have granted blanket commutations to death row inmates during his final days in office. Arkansas Governor Winthrop Rockefeller also commuted the sentence of every death row inmate in that state as he left office after losing his 1970 bid for a third two-year term, as did New Mexico Governor Toney Anaya before he left office in 1986 and Ohio Governor Dick Celeste before he left office in 1990.

Ryan won praise from death penalty opponents: as early as 2001, he received the Mario Cuomo Act of Courage Award from Death Penalty Focus, in 2003 the Rose Elizabeth Bird Commitment to Justice Award from the same organization, and in 2005 he was nominated for the Nobel Peace Prize. On the other side of the Atlantic, Robert Badinter, who had successfully introduced the bill abolishing the death penalty in France in 1981 praised Ryan's decision. Many conservatives, though, were opposed to the commutations, some questioning his motives, which came as a federal corruption investigation closed in on the governor and his closest political allies (see below). Conservative columnist Pat Buchanan called Ryan "pathetic", and suggested the governor was attempting to save his public image in hopes of avoiding prison himself. Buchanan noted "Ryan announced his decision to a wildly cheering crowd at the Northwestern University Law School. Families of the victims of the soon-to-be-reprieved killers were not invited."

Scandals, trial, and conviction
Ryan's political career was marred by a scandal called "Operation Safe Road", which involved the illegal sale of government licenses, contracts and leases by state employees during his prior service as Secretary of State.  In the wake of numerous convictions of his former aides, he chose not to run for reelection in 2002. Seventy-nine former state officials, lobbyists, and others were charged in the investigation, and at least 76 were convicted.

The corruption scandal leading to Ryan's downfall began more than a decade earlier during a federal investigation into a deadly crash in Wisconsin.  Six children from the Willis family of Chicago, Illinois, were killed; their parents, Rev. Duane and Janet Willis, were severely burned. The investigation revealed a scheme inside Ryan's Secretary of State's office in which unqualified truck drivers obtained licenses through bribes.

In March 2003, Scott Fawell, Ryan's former chief of staff and campaign manager, was convicted on federal charges of racketeering and fraud. He was sentenced to six years and six months. Former deputy campaign manager Richard Juliano pleaded guilty to related charges and testified against Fawell at trial. Roger Stanley, a former Republican state representative who was hired by Ryan and testified against Fawell, pleaded guilty to wide-ranging corruption, admitting he paid kickbacks to win state contracts and campaign business, secretly mailed out vicious false attacks on political opponents and helped obtain ghost-payrolling jobs.

Indictment
The investigation finally reached the former governor, and in December 2003, Ryan and lobbyist Lawrence Warner were named in a 22-count federal indictment. The charges included racketeering, bribery, extortion, money laundering and tax fraud. The indictment alleged that Ryan steered several state contracts to Warner and other friends; disbursed campaign funds to relatives and to pay personal expenses; and obstructed justice by attempting to end the state investigation of the license-for-bribes scandal. He was charged with lying to investigators and accepting cash, gifts and loans in return for his official actions as governor. On September 19, 2005, the case went to trial.

Fawell, under pressure from prosecutors, became a key witness against Ryan and Warner. He agreed to a plea deal that cut the prison time for himself and his fiancée, Andrea Coutretsis. Fawell was a controversial witness, not hiding his disdain for prosecutors from the witness stand. According to CBS Chicago political editor Mike Flannery, insiders claimed that Fawell had been "much like a son" to Ryan throughout their careers. At Ryan's trial, Fawell acknowledged that the prosecution had his "head in a vise", and that he found his cooperation with the government against Ryan "the most distasteful thing I've ever done". Nonetheless, he spent several days on the witness stand testifying against Ryan and Warner. Once a tough-talking political strategist, Fawell wept on the witness stand as he acknowledged that his motivation for testifying was to spare Coutretsis a long prison sentence for her role in the conspiracy. The jury was twice sent out of the courtroom so that he could wipe tears from his eyes and regain his composure.

Ryan's daughters and a son-in-law, Michael Fairman, were implicated by testimony during the trial. Stipulations agreed upon by the defense and prosecution and submitted to the court included admissions that all five of Ryan's daughters received illegal payments from the Ryan campaign. In addition to Lynda Fairman, who received funds beyond those her husband Michael testified he had received, the stipulations included admissions from the rest of Ryan's daughters that they did little or no work in return for the payments. In addition, Fawell testified that Ryan's mother's housekeeper was illegally paid from campaign funds, and that Ryan's adopted sister, Nancy Ferguson, received campaign funds without performing campaign work. The prosecution took nearly four months to present their case, as a parade of other witnesses (including Juliano) followed Fawell.

On April 17, 2006, the jury found Ryan and Warner guilty on all counts. However, when ruling on post-trial motions, the judge dismissed two counts against Ryan for lack of proof. Ryan said that he would appeal the verdict, largely due to the issues with the jury.

Patrick Fitzgerald, the federal prosecutor, noted, "Mr. Ryan steered contracts worth millions of dollars to friends and took payments and vacations in return. When he was a sitting governor, he lied to the FBI about this conduct and then he went out and did it again." He charged that one of the most egregious aspects of the corruption was Ryan's action after learning that bribes were being paid for licenses. Instead of ending the practice he tried to end the investigation that had uncovered it, Fitzgerald said, calling the moment "a low-water mark for public service".

On September 6, 2006, Ryan was sentenced to six and a half years in prison. He was ordered to go to prison on January 4, 2007, but the appellate court granted an appeal bond, allowing him to remain free pending the outcome of the appeal. His conviction was affirmed by the Court of Appeals of the Seventh Circuit on August 21, 2007, and review by the entire Seventh Circuit was denied on October 25, 2007. The Seventh Circuit then rejected Ryan's bid to remain free while he asked the U.S. Supreme Court to hear his case; the opinion called the evidence of Ryan's guilt "overwhelming". The Supreme Court rejected an extension of his bail, and Ryan reported to the Federal Prison Camp in Oxford, Wisconsin, on November 7, 2007. He was transferred on February 29, 2008, to a medium security facility in Terre Haute, Indiana, after Oxford changed its level of medical care and stopped housing inmates over 70 years old. He was listed as Federal Inmate Number 16627-424 and was released on July 3, 2013.

Defense and appeal
Ryan's defense was provided pro bono by Winston & Strawn, a law firm managed by former governor Jim Thompson. The defense cost the firm $10 million through mid-November 2005. Estimates of the cost to the firm as of September 2006 ranged as high as $20 million. Ryan served as Thompson's lieutenant governor from 1983 to 1991. After the United States Supreme Court declined to hear Ryan's appeal, Thompson indicated that he would ask then President George W. Bush to commute Ryan's sentence to time served. United States Senator Dick Durbin wrote a letter to Bush dated December 1, 2008, asking him to commute Ryan's sentence, citing Ryan's age and his wife's frail health, saying, "This action would not pardon him of his crimes or remove the record of his conviction, but it would allow him to return to his wife and family for their remaining years." Bush did not commute Ryan's sentence.

After his conviction Ryan's annual $197,037 state pension was suspended under state law. Ryan's attorneys litigated the pension matter all the way to the Illinois Supreme Court, which ruled on February 19, 2010, that state law "plainly mandates that none of the benefits provided for under the system shall be paid to Ryan". Ryan was paid $635,000 in pension benefits during the three years between his retirement and his political corruption conviction, plus a refund of the $235,500 in personal contributions he made during his 30 years in public office.

Sentencing
In 2010, Ryan requested early release, partly because his wife had terminal cancer and was given only six months to live, and partly on the grounds that some of his convictions should be vacated in light of a Supreme Court ruling that was alleged to have affected their legitimacy. On December 21, 2010, U.S. District Court Judge Rebecca Pallmeyer denied Ryan's request.

On January 5, 2011, Ryan was taken from his prison cell in Terre Haute, Indiana, to a hospital in Kankakee to visit his dying wife. He was present when she died five months after that visit. Ryan entered a Salvation Army halfway house in Chicago on January 30, 2013. Less than three hours later, he was released back to his home in Kankakee where he remained on home confinement until July 3, 2013.

Electoral history 
 1998 – Illinois Governor
 George Ryan (R) 51%
 Glenn Poshard (D) 47.5%
 Lawrence Redmond (Reform) 1.5%
 1994 – Illinois Secretary of State
 George Ryan (R) 61.5%
 Patrick Quinn (D) 38.5%
 1990 – Illinois Secretary of State
 George Ryan (R) 53.5%
 Jerome Cosentino (D) 46.5%

References 

 NBC News

External links 
 CNN.com: Blanket commutation' empties Illinois death row", January 11, 2003.
 Biography from site supporting his nomination for a Nobel Peace Prize
 Chicago Sun-Times archive on The George Ryan Trial
 Strange Hero: George Ryan and the death penalty
 

|-

|-

|-

|-

|-

|-

|-

1934 births
American businesspeople in retailing
American pharmacists
County board members in Illinois
Criminals from Illinois
Ferris State University alumni
Republican Party governors of Illinois
Illinois politicians convicted of crimes
Republican Party members of the Illinois House of Representatives
Lieutenant Governors of Illinois
Living people
Military personnel from Illinois
People from Kankakee, Illinois
People from Maquoketa, Iowa
Illinois politicians convicted of corruption
Politicians convicted of mail and wire fraud
Politicians convicted of racketeering
Secretaries of State of Illinois
Speakers of the Illinois House of Representatives
United States Army personnel of the Korean War
United States Army soldiers